Reticulofilosa is a grouping of Rhizaria.

It includes Chlorarachnea (Chlorarachnion, Bigelowiella, Lotharella, Cryptochlora, Gymnochlora) and Proteomyxidea  (Pseudospora, Leucodictyon, Reticulamoeba, Massisteria, Dimorpha, Gymnophrys, Borkovia).

References 

Filosa
Superclasses (biology)